Mary Ann Shallcross Smith (born 1952) is an American educator and a Democratic member of the Rhode Island House of Representatives, representing the 46th District from 2009 to 2011, and again starting in 2021. During the 2009-2010 sessions, she served on the House Committees on Constituent Services, Finance, Labor and Small Business. Shallcross Smith was defeated for reelection in the 2 November 2010 general elections to Jeremiah T. O'Grady. She went on to be the president and CEO of Dr. Day Care, and she founded the Business Owners of Child Care Association of Rhode Island (BOCA) in 2011. Shallcross Smith was also the chairperson of the Northern Rhode Island Chamber of Commerce in 2016.

References

External links
Rhode Island House - Representative Mary Ann Shallcross Smith official RI House website

Democratic Party members of the Rhode Island House of Representatives
1952 births
Living people
People from Providence County, Rhode Island
Women state legislators in Rhode Island
University of Rhode Island alumni
21st-century American politicians
21st-century American women politicians